Bar mitzvah (Hebrew: בַּר מִצְוָה) is a Jewish coming of age ritual for boys.

Bar Mitzvah can also refer to:

Bar mitzvah attack, an attack on the SSL/TLS protocols that exploits the use of the RC4 cipher with weak keys for that cipher
Bar Mitzvah Boy, British television play on the BBC based on a script by Jack Rosenthal
Bar Mitzvah Boy (musical), a musical based on above

See also
Bat Mitzvah (disambiguation)
The Black Bar Mitzvah, 2012 mixtape by American rapper Rick Ross
Ruin Jonny's Bar Mitzvah, 2004 live album by Me First and the Gimme Gimmes
Adult bar mitzvah, a bar mitzvah of a person older than the customary age